Vid Juricskay (born 12 August 1934) is an Australian sprint canoeist who competed in the mid-1960s. He was eliminated in the semifinals of the C-2 1000 m event at the 1964 Summer Olympics in Tokyo.

References
Sports-reference.com profile

1934 births
Australian male canoeists
Canoeists at the 1964 Summer Olympics
Living people
Olympic canoeists of Australia
20th-century Australian people